These are the results of the Men's 3000 metres steeplechase event at the 1997 World Championships in Athletics held in Athens, Greece on 3, 4 and 6 August.

Medalists

Results

Heats
First 6 of each heat (Q) and the next 6 fastest (q) qualified for the semifinals.

Semifinals
First 5 of each heat (Q) and the next 4 fastest (q) qualified for the final.

Final

References
 Results
 IAAF

- Mens 3000 Metres Steeplechase
Steeplechase at the World Athletics Championships